Nowe Kamienice  is a village in the administrative district of Gmina Ostrów Wielkopolski, within Ostrów Wielkopolski County, Greater Poland Voivodeship, in west-central Poland.

The village has a population of 160.

References

Nowe Kamienice